Wolf spiders are members of the family Lycosidae. They are robust and agile hunters with excellent eyesight. They live mostly in solitude, hunt alone, and do not spin webs. Some are opportunistic hunters, pouncing upon prey as they find it or chasing it over short distances; others wait for passing prey in or near the mouth of a burrow.

Wolf spiders resemble nursery web spiders (family Pisauridae), but wolf spiders carry their egg sacs by attaching them to their spinnerets, while the Pisauridae carry their egg sacs with their chelicerae and pedipalps. Two of the wolf spider's eight eyes are large and prominent; this distinguishes them from nursery web spiders, whose eyes are all of roughly equal size. This can also help distinguish them from the similar-looking grass spiders.

Description

They have eight eyes arranged in three rows. The bottom row consists of four small eyes, the middle row has two very large eyes (which distinguishes them from the Pisauridae), and the top row has two medium-sized eyes. Unlike most other arachnids, which are generally blind or have poor vision, wolf spiders have excellent eyesight.

The tapetum lucidum is a retroreflective tissue found in eyes. This reflective tissue is only found in the four largest eyes ("secondary eyes") of the wolf spider. Flashing a beam of light over the spider produces eyeshine; this eyeshine can be seen when the lighting source is roughly coaxial with the viewer or sensor. The light from the light source (e.g., a flashlight or sunlight) has been reflected from the spider's eyes directly back toward its source, producing a "glow" that is easily noticed. Wolf spiders possess the third-best eyesight of all spider groups, bettered by jumping spiders of the family Salticidae (which can distinguish colors) and the huntsman spiders.

Wolf spiders are unique in the way that they carry their eggs. The egg sac, a round, silken globe, is attached to the spinnerets at the end of the abdomen, allowing the spider to carry her unhatched young with her. The abdomen must be held in a raised position to keep the egg case from dragging on the ground. Despite this handicap, they are still capable of hunting. Another aspect unique to wolf spiders is their method of care of young. Immediately after the spiderlings emerge from their protective silken case, they clamber up their mother's legs and crowd onto the dorsal side of her abdomen. The mother carries the spiderlings for several weeks before they are large enough to disperse and fend for themselves. No other spiders are currently known to carry their young on their backs for any period of time.

Because they depend on camouflage for protection, they do not have the flashy appearance of some other kinds of spiders. In general, their coloration is appropriate to their favorite habitat.

Hogna is the genus with the largest of the wolf spiders. It is sometimes confused with H. helluo, which is somewhat smaller and different in coloration. The underside of H. carolinensis is solid black, but the underside of H. helluo is variegated and has reds, oranges, and yellows with shades of black.

Some members of the Lycosidae, such as H. carolinensis, make deep, tubular burrows in which they lurk much of the time. Others, such as H. helluo, seek shelter under rocks and other shelters as nature may provide. As with spiders in general, males of almost any species can sometimes be found inside homes and buildings as they wander in search for females during the autumn.

Wolf spiders play an important role in natural population control of insects and are often considered "beneficial bugs" due to their predation of pest species within farms and gardens.

Venom
Wolf spiders inject venom if continually provoked. Symptoms of their bites include swelling, mild pain, and itching. In the past, necrotic bites have been attributed to some South American and Australian species, but further investigation has indicated that those problems that did occur were probably actually due to bites by members of other genera or not inducing those effects.

Genera

, the World Spider Catalog accepts these genera:

 Acantholycosa Dahl, 1908—Asia, Europe, North America
 Adelocosa Gertsch, 1973—Hawaii
 Agalenocosa Mello-Leitão, 1944—South America, Oceania, Mexico, India
 Aglaoctenus Tullgren, 1905—South America
 Algidus New York, 1975-USA
 Allocosa Banks, 1900—Oceania, North America, Africa, South America, Costa Rica, Asia, Europe
 Allotrochosina Roewer, 1960—Australia, New Zealand
 Alopecosa Simon, 1885—Asia, Europe, South America, Africa, North America, Oceania
 Amblyothele Simon, 1910—Africa
 Anomalomma Simon, 1890—Pakistan, Indonesia, Zimbabwe
 Anomalosa Roewer, 1960—Australia
 Anoteropsis L. Koch, 1878—New Zealand, Papua New Guinea
 Arctosa C. L. Koch, 1847—Africa, Europe, Asia, South America, North America, Vanuatu
 Arctosippa Roewer, 1960—Peru
 Arctosomma Roewer, 1960—Ethiopia
 Artoria Thorell, 1877—Oceania, Africa, Asia
 Artoriellula Roewer, 1960—South Africa, Indonesia
 Artoriopsis Framenau, 2007—Australia, New Zealand
 Aulonia C. L. Koch, 1847—Turkey
 Auloniella Roewer, 1960—Tanzania
 Birabenia Mello-Leitão, 1941—Argentina, Uruguay
 Bogdocosa Ponomarev & Belosludtsev, 2008—Asia
 Brevilabus Strand, 1908—Ivory Coast, Senegal, Ethiopia
 Bristowiella Saaristo, 1980—Comoros, Seychelles
 Camptocosa Dondale, Jiménez & Nieto, 2005—United States, Mexico
 Caporiaccosa Roewer, 1960—Ethiopia
 Caspicosa Ponomarev, 2007—Kazakhstan, Russia
 Costacosa Framenau & Leung, 2013—Australia
 Crocodilosa Caporiacco, 1947—India, Myanmar, Egypt
 Cynosa Caporiacco, 1933—North Africa
 Dejerosa Roewer, 1960—Mozambique
 Deliriosa Kovblyuk, 2009—Ukraine
 Diahogna Roewer, 1960—Australia
 Diapontia Keyserling, 1877—South America
 Dingosa Roewer, 1955—Australia, Peru, Brazil
 Dolocosa Roewer, 1960—St. Helena
 Donacosa Alderweireldt & Jocqué, 1991—Spain
 Dorjulopirata Buchar, 1997—Bhutan
 Draposa Kronestedt, 2010—Asia
 Dzhungarocosa Fomichev & Marusik, 2017—Kazakhstan
 Edenticosa Roewer, 1960—Equatorial Guinea
 Evippa Simon, 1882—Africa, Asia, Spain
 Evippomma Roewer, 1959—Africa, Asia
 Foveosa Russell-Smith, Alderweireldt & Jocqué, 2007
 Geolycosa Montgomery, 1904—Africa, South America, Asia, North America, Oceania
 Gladicosa Brady, 1987—North America
 Gnatholycosa Mello-Leitão, 1940—Argentina
 Gulocosa Marusik, Omelko & Koponen, 2015
 Hesperocosa Gertsch & Wallace, 1937—United States
 Hippasa Simon, 1885—Africa, Asia
 Hippasella Mello-Leitão, 1944—Argentina, Peru, Bolivia
 Hoggicosa Roewer, 1960—Australia
 Hogna Simon, 1885—Asia, Africa, South America, North America, Caribbean, Europe, Oceania, Central America
 Hognoides Roewer, 1960—Tanzania, Madagascar
 Hyaenosa Caporiacco, 1940—Asia, Africa
 Hygrolycosa Dahl, 1908—Asia, Greece
 Karakumosa Logunov & Ponomarev, 2020—Asia
 Kangarosa Framenau, 2010—Australia
 Katableps Jocqué, Russell-Smith & Alderweireldt, 2011
 Knoelle Framenau, 2006—Australia
 Lobizon Piacentini & Grismado, 2009—Argentina
 Loculla Simon, 1910—Iran, Africa
 Lycosa Latreille, 1804—North America, Africa, Caribbean, Asia, Oceania, South America, Central America, Europe
 Lycosella Thorell, 1890—Indonesia
 Lysania Thorell, 1890—China, Malaysia, Indonesia
 Mainosa Framenau, 2006—Australia
 Malimbosa Roewer, 1960—West Africa
 Margonia Hippa & Lehtinen, 1983—India
 Megarctosa Caporiacco, 1948—Africa, Asia, Argentina, Greece
 Melecosa Marusik, Omelko & Koponen, 2015
 Melocosa Gertsch, 1937—North America, Brazil
 Minicosa Alderweireldt & Jocqué, 2007—South Africa
 Molitorosa Roewer, 1960—Brazil
 Mongolicosa Marusik, Azarkina & Koponen, 2004—Mongolia, China
 Mustelicosa Roewer, 1960—Ukraine, Asia
 Navira Piacentini & Grismado, 2009—Argentina
 Notocosa Vink, 2002—New Zealand
 Nukuhiva Berland, 1935—Marquesas Is.
 Oculicosa Zyuzin, 1993—Kazakhstan, Uzbekistan, Turkmenistan
 Ocyale Audouin, 1826—Africa, Peru, Asia
 Orinocosa Chamberlin, 1916—South America, Africa, Asia
 Ovia Sankaran, Malamel & Sebastian, 2017—India, China, Taiwan
 Paratrochosina Roewer, 1960—Argentina, North America, Russia
 Pardosa C. L. Koch, 1847—Asia, Europe, South America, North America, Africa, Caribbean, Oceania, Central America
 Pardosella Caporiacco, 1939—Ethiopia, Tanzania
 Passiena Thorell, 1890—Africa, Asia
 Pavocosa Roewer, 1960—Argentina, Brazil, Thailand
 Phonophilus Ehrenberg, 1831—Libya
 Pirata Sundevall, 1833—South America, Africa, North America, Asia, Cuba, Central America
 Piratula Roewer, 1960—Asia, North America, Ukraine
 Portacosa Framenau, 2017—Australia
 Proevippa Purcell, 1903—Africa
 Prolycosides Mello-Leitão, 1942—Argentina
 Pseudevippa Simon, 1910—Namibia
 Pterartoria Purcell, 1903—South Africa, Lesotho
 Pyrenecosa Marusik, Azarkina & Koponen, 2004—Europe
 Rabidosa Roewer, 1960—United States
 Satta Lehtinen & Hippa, 1979—Papua New Guinea
 Schizocosa Chamberlin, 1904—South America, Asia, Africa, North America, Vanuatu, Central America
 Shapna Hippa & Lehtinen, 1983—India
 Sibirocosa Marusik, Azarkina & Koponen, 2004—Russia
 Sosippus Simon, 1888—North America, Central America
 Syroloma Simon, 1900—Hawaii
 Tapetosa Framenau, Main, Harvey & Waldock, 2009
 Tasmanicosa Roewer, 1959—Australia
 Tetralycosa Roewer, 1960—Australia
 Tigrosa Brady, 2012—North America
 Trabea Simon, 1876—Africa, Spain, Turkey
 Trabeops Roewer, 1959—North America
 Trebacosa Dondale & Redner, 1981—Europe, North America
 Tricassa Simon, 1910—Namibia, South Africa, Madagascar
 Trochosa C. L. Koch, 1847—North America, Asia, Africa, South America, Oceania, Central America, Europe, Caribbean
 Trochosippa Roewer, 1960—Africa, Indonesia, Argentina
 Tuberculosa Framenau & Yoo, 2006—Australia
 Varacosa Chamberlin & Ivie, 1942—North America
 Venator Hogg, 1900—Australia
 Venatrix Roewer, 1960—Oceania, Philippines
 Venonia Thorell, 1894—Asia, Oceania
 Vesubia Simon, 1910—Italy, Russia, Turkmenistan
 Wadicosa Zyuzin, 1985—Africa, Asia
 Xerolycosa Dahl, 1908—Asia, Tanzania
 Zantheres Thorell, 1887—Myanmar
 Zenonina Simon, 1898—Africa
 Zoica Simon, 1898—Asia, Oceania
 Zyuzicosa Logunov, 2010—Asia

Evolutionary history 
Wolf spiders likely originated after the K–Pg extinction event sometime in the late Paleocene, with most main subfamilies likely originating during the Eocene and Early Oligocene between 41 and 32 million years ago.

Habitats
Wolf spiders are found in a wide range of habitats both coastal and inland. These include shrublands, woodland, wet coastal forest, alpine meadows, suburban gardens, and homes. Spiderlings disperse aerially; consequently, wolf spiders have wide distributions. Although some species have very specific microhabitat needs (such as stream-side gravel beds or montane herb-fields), most are wanderers without permanent homes. Some build burrows which can be left open or have a trap door (depending on species). Arid-zone species construct turrets or plug their holes with leaves and pebbles during the rainy season to protect themselves from flood waters. Often, they are found in man-made locations such as sheds and other outdoor equipment.

Mating behavior

Many species of wolf spiders possess very complex courtship behaviors and secondary sexual characteristics, such as tufts of bristles on their legs or special colorations, which are most often found on the males of the species. These sexual characteristics vary by species and are most often found as modifications of the first pair of legs. First-leg modifications are often divided into elongated bristles on the legs, increased swelling of leg segments, or the full elongation of the first pair of legs compared to the other three pairs. Some mating behaviors are common between wolf spider genera, and many more that are species-specific. In the most commonly studied genus of wolf spiders, Schizocosa, researchers found that all males engage in a seismic component of their courtship display, either stridulation, or drumming their fore legs on the ground, but some also dependent on visual cues in their courtship display, as well as the seismic signaling, such as waving the front two legs in the air in front of the female, concluding that some Schizocosa species rely on multimodal courtship behaviors.

The Lycosidae comprise mainly wandering spiders, and as such, population density and male-to-female sex ratio puts selective pressures on wolf spiders when finding mates. Female wolf spiders that have already mated are more likely to eat the next male that tries to mate with them than those that have not mated yet. Males that have already mated have a higher probability of successfully mating again, but females that have already mated have a lower probability of mating again.

In culture
South Carolina designated the Carolina wolf spider (Hogna carolinensis) as the official state spider in 2000 due to the efforts of Skyler B. Hutto, a third-grade student at Sheridan Elementary School in Orangeburg.

At the time, South Carolina was the only U.S. state that recognized a state spider. In 2015, efforts began to name an official state spider for neighboring  North Carolina.

Gallery

See also
 List of spiders associated with cutaneous reactions
 List of Lycosidae genera
 List of Lycosidae species

References

Further reading
Platnick, Norman I. (2008): The world spider catalog, version 8.5. American Museum of Natural History.

External links

Wolf Spider Website Comprehensive site with info on a range of subject, from habitat, to life-cycle, to myths and facts about bites. Includes videos of Wolf Spiders in the wild and captivity (Accessed September 7, 2015) Archived Link

Lycosidae